Trust is a free bi-annual investment trust magazine issued by Baillie Gifford, the Edinburgh-based investment management company. First published in June 2004, it reached issue 36 in March 2018.

Content 
Trust contains a variety of stimulating features and news, with contributions from professionals at Baillie Gifford and topical investment articles written by respected financial journalists.

Formats 
Initially, Trust was available to download online in PDF format, but in February 2010 the company launched Trust Online, an interactive website featuring all the magazine content as well as additional web-only investment trust articles. Since then the magazine has become available in a digital e-zine version.

Awards 
Trust has won several awards at the Association of Investment Companies ‘Best Information to Shareholders Awards.’ It won ‘Best Newsletter’ for the fourth year running in 2014. It previously won the award in 2013, 2012 and 2011.

References

External links 
 Trust Magazine Digital Version
 Baillie Gifford
 Association of Investment Companies

Business magazines published in the United Kingdom
Magazines established in 2004
Biannual magazines published in the United Kingdom
Free magazines